Beach is an unincorporated community in Ware County, in the U.S. state of Georgia.

History
A post office called Beach was established in 1890, and remained in operation until 1930. In 1900, the community had 250 inhabitants.

References

Unincorporated communities in Ware County, Georgia